Cyril Howard Beach (born 28 March 1909, date of death unknown) was an English professional footballer who played as an inside forward for Charlton Athletic and Sunderland.

References

1909 births
Year of death missing
Sportspeople from Nuneaton
English footballers
Association football inside forwards
Charlton Athletic F.C. players
Sunderland A.F.C. players
Peterborough United F.C. players
English Football League players